Knut Andersen (16 January 1908 – 22 September 1981) was a Norwegian footballer. He played in one match for the Norway national football team in 1930.

References

External links
 

1908 births
1981 deaths
Norwegian footballers
Norway international footballers
Association football midfielders
Frigg Oslo FK players